The Agreement on settlement of political crisis in Ukraine was a set of documents that were intended to end the Revolution of Dignity peacefully that was signed on 21 February 2014 by the then-President of Ukraine Viktor Yanukovych and the leaders of the Ukrainian parliamentary opposition, under the mediation of the European Union and Russia.

The signing of the Agreement intended to reduce bloodshed at Euromaidan demonstrations in Kyiv, which during the Revolution of Dignity became significantly more violent, resulting in the deaths of over 100 people, as well as to end the political crisis caused by Euromaidan, which began in November 2013 in connection with the decision of Ukrainian authorities to suspend the process of signing an association agreement with the European Union.

An agreement to resolve the political crisis was signed by the President of Ukraine Viktor Yanukovych and opposition leaders Vitali Klitschko (Ukrainian Democratic Alliance for Reform), Arseniy Yatsenyuk (All-Ukrainian Union "Fatherland") and Oleh Tyahnybok (Svoboda), and formally witnessed by the Foreign Ministers of Germany and Poland, Frank-Walter Steinmeier and Radosław Sikorski, and the head of the Department for Continental Europe of the French Ministry of Foreign Affairs Eric Fournier. Special representative of the President of the Russian Federation Vladimir Lukin, who participated in the negotiations, refused to put his signature under the agreement.

The Agreement provided for a return to the 2004 Constitution, that is, to a parliamentary-presidential form of government, the holding of early presidential elections before the end of 2014 and form a "government of national trust". It also provided for the withdrawal of security forces from downtown Kyiv, the cessation of violence and surrender of weapons by the opposition.

The Agreement, although signed by all parties, did not last long, as Yanukovych soon afterwards fled to Russia and became a fugitive, resulting in Euromaidan’s success.

Evaluation agreement 

Vladimir Lukin, explaining his refusal to sign the Agreement, stated that "Moscow has decided not to sign these agreements for a very valid reason, actually – don't really understand the situation with those who are the subject of this agreement," agreement "is not visible forces and those who have to implement."

On 21 February, with a public announcement by the Maidan leaders of the parliamentary opposition of the signed Agreement, one of the activists of "self-Defense Maidan" Volodymyr Parasyuk said that he and "Maidan self-Defense" were not satisfied with the gradual political reforms specified in the document, and demanded the immediate resignation of President Yanukovych – otherwise, he threatened to storm the presidential administration and the Verkhovna Rada. This statement was met with applause. The leader of the "Right Sector" Dmytro Yarosh stated that the Agreement does not provide a clear commitment to the President's resignation, the dissolution of the Verkhovna Rada, the punishment of heads of law enforcement agencies and "criminal orders, which were killed about a hundred Ukrainian citizens", and refused to comply with it. On the night of 22 February, Euromaidan activists occupied the government quarter as law enforcement was abandoning it, and put forward a number of new requirements – in particular, they demanded the immediate resignation of President Yanukovych.

Later, Russian President Vladimir Putin described the Agreement as a practical surrender of power – Yanukovych agreed to all demands of the opposition.

Evaluating

Viktor Yanukovych 
 Viktor Yanukovych: "the Opposition and radical forces, which were submitted on the Maidan, and not only on the Maidan, but also in other regions, they had to disarm, vacate all the occupied territories. But it was not implemented. And, as a result, Kyiv was overrun by armed men who began to smash homes, religious institutions, temples, began to suffer completely innocent people. People just on the streets robbed and beaten. And it continues today. So the agreement for us, of course, gave some hope. But with everything that happened next, it's difficult to call any epithets".
 Appeal from the 28 March 2014 Yanukovych said: "I will seek the lawful execution of the agreement of 21 February and will make every effort to get organized this farce was completely exposed and those responsible for the collapse of the state duly punished".
 2 April 2014 Yanukovych gave an interview to Russian and foreign media, during which he said:
"Immediately after the signing of the agreement, I began to fulfill that part of the obligations that the government assumed. As the president of Ukraine, without delay, I instructed the police to retreat from the Maidan. Its radical part responded with shooting... My principle that no power is worth a drop of shed blood, I have always professed.

"In 2004, during the events of the Orange Revolution, I did not allow clashes between the opposing sides. When I signed the agreement, I was doomed to keep it. And I believed that the guarantors, the EU foreign ministers, would fulfill their obligations as well. I did not assume that this was a trap for the authorities, for the President of Ukraine, because already that night militants began to attack me openly, with weapons ... I am a living person, first of all. But I didn’t even hear words of condemnation against the bandits, who began to be called activists.".

Ukraine 

 The Verkhovna Rada appointed Prime Minister of Ukraine Arseniy Yatsenyuk: "the First basic commitment was about the return of the 2004 Constitution, but the next day Viktor Yanukovych publicly refused to sign the bill and walked out of this Agreement"; "the government of Ukraine was formed, as allowed by the Agreement, namely the inclusive government, which received even the new opposition in the face of the Party of regions. Constitutional majority 371 votes in the Parliament voted for this government".
 Professor of law, one of the developers of the Constitution Viktor Musiyaka: "First, he within 48 hours from the moment of signing of the agreement with the opposition has not signed adopted by the Verkhovna Rada of Ukraine the Law on the renewal of the Constitution of Ukraine as amended on 08.12.2004 G. That he actually disavowed his signature to the agreement and made it legally null and void". "Yanukovych, had to say about the unconditional execution of their powers and even to veto the laws passed by the Parliament. But for this he was necessary to remain in the workplace".

United States 
 U.S. permanent representative to the UN Samantha Power: "It was Yanukovych who violated the terms of this Agreement, after leaving Kyiv, and then Ukraine".

Russian Federation 

Refused to sign.
 The next day, 22 February 2014, Minister of Foreign Affairs Sergey Lavrov urged the foreign Ministers of Germany, France and Poland Frank-Walter Steinmeier, Laurent Fabius and Sikorski to put pressure on the Ukrainian opposition to implement the Agreement to resolve the political crisis in Ukraine.
 The Russian President Vladimir Putin, speaking about the actions of Yanukovych: "... He gave the instruction to withdraw all police forces from the capital, and they complied with his order. He went to the event in Kharkiv, as soon as he had gone to Kharkiv, instead of the release of previously occupied administrative buildings, immediately seized and his presidential residence, government building, instead of trying to fulfill what we agreed".
 Minister of Foreign Affairs Sergey Lavrov: "According to this agreement, the authorities refused to impose a state of emergency, were removed from the streets by law enforcement. The opposition has done nothing. Illegal weapons haven't been handed in, public buildings and streets of Kyiv aren't fully free [of people], the radicals continue to control cities. Instead of the promised creation of a national unity government, the creation of the government of the winners has been announced".
 5 March 2014 Sergey Lavrov had a meeting with Secretary of state John Kerry. According to the Russian diplomat, they agreed on the necessity of implementation in Ukraine of the agreement of 21 February. Also, in the plans of the Russian Foreign Minister meeting with the Foreign Ministers of France, Germany and Poland, witnesses at the signing ceremony.

Intermediaries conclusion 
 The foreign Ministers of Germany, France and Poland urged the new Ukrainian government to respect the Agreement of 21 February: "As intermediaries for the conclusion, we call on the Ukrainian authorities to do everything possible to the basic principles contained in the document became part of the Ukrainian policy". This was a joint statement by Frank-Walter Steinmeier, Laurent Fabius and Sikorski made in Germany by the end of the meeting on 31 March 2014.

References

Euromaidan
2014 in Ukraine
Treaties of Ukraine